The Al Rajhi Bank (previously known as Al Rajhi Banking and Investment Corporation) is a Saudi Arabian bank and the world's largest Islamic bank by capital based on 2015 data.

The bank is a major investor in Saudi Arabia's business and is one of the largest joint stock companies in the Kingdom, with over SR 330.5 billion in AUM ($88 billion) and over 600 branches. Its head office is located in Riyadh, with six regional offices. Al Rajhi Bank also has branches in Kuwait and Jordan, and a subsidiary in Malaysia and Syria.

Al Rajhi Bank has market capitalization of SR 302.80 billion.

History 
Al Rajhi Bank was founded in 1957, and is one of the largest banks in Saudi Arabia, with over 9,600 employees and $88 billion in assets. The bank is headquartered in Riyadh, and has over 600 branches, primarily in Saudi Arabia, but also in Kuwait, and Jordan, with a subsidiary in Malaysia. The bank was started by four brothers, Saleh, Sulaiman, Mohamed, and, Abdullah of the Al Rajhi family, one of the wealthiest families in Saudi Arabia. The bank initially began as a group of banking and commercial operations which, in 1978, joined together under the umbrella of the Al Rajhi Trading and Exchange Company. The company changed to a joint stock company in 1987, and after two years was rebranded as the Al Rajhi Banking and Investment Corporation. In 2006, the bank rebranded itself as Al Rajhi Bank. It is traded on the Saudi Arabian Stock Exchange (Tadawul), and around 75% of their shares are publicly owned. Al Rajhi family members are the bank's largest shareholders.

In 2006, after nearly 50 years of operation solely within Saudi Arabia, the bank launched in Al Rajhi Bank Malaysia, signifying its first foray into international banking.

Operations 

Al Rajhi Bank offers a variety of banking services such as deposits, loans, investment advice, securities trading, remittances, credit cards, and consumer financing. All services are offered according to Islamic requirements. The bank has won a numerous awards for its Middle East operations. Abdullah bin Sulaiman Al Rajhi is the bank's Chairman of the Board of Directors and Stefano Bertamini is CEO. The board of directors has eleven directors, four are Al Rajhi family members: Mohammed bin Abdullah Al Rajhi, Sulaiman bin Saleh Al Rajhi Abdullah bin Sulaiman Al Rajhi Chairman of the Board of Directors, and Bader bin Mohammed Al Rajhi.

In September 2016, Al Rajhi became the first bank in Saudi Arabia to partner with the Ministry of Housing, participating in the government's plans to increase home ownership by offering mortgages funded in part by the state. Traditionally, the bank had focused on consumer banking, but had begun diversifying its revenues with plans to adjust focus towards mid-corporate and small and medium-sized enterprise (SME) business as the Saudi government implemented its broader social reform agenda and the National Transformation Programme (NTP). As of 2016, 70 percent of Al Rajhi's assets and 55 to 60 percent of its revenue were generated from consumer banking, and the bank has an 18 percent share of the mortgage market in the Kingdom.

Controversy 
Al Rajhi Bank faced allegations in multiple U.S. lawsuits following the attacks on September 11, 2001, including claims that Al Rajhi Bank was used to complete financial transactions for people or nonprofit organizations with terrorist ties. Al Rajhi-related nonprofit and business ventures located in Virginia were subjected to searches and seizures by U.S. law officials trying to disrupt terrorist financing activities in the United States in 2002. In January 2005, the U.S. District Court for the Southern District of New York dismissed all claims against the Bank.  The Court held: "Plaintiffs do not offer facts to support their conclusions that Al Rajhi Bank had to know that Defendant charities . . . were supporting . . . terrorism. . . .  Even accepting all the allegations against Al Rajhi Bank as true, Plaintiffs have failed to state a claim that would entitle them to relief." Despite these allegations, on June 30, 2014, the U.S. Supreme Court issued an order leaving intact the dismissal with prejudice of all claims against the bank, as well as Sulaiman bin Abdulaziz Al Rajhi (the bank's founder and former chairman) and Abdullah bin Suleiman Al Rajhi (the bank's chairman and former CEO) among others, related to the terrorist attacks of September 11, 2001. The Supreme Court's order brought a final close to claims asserted against the bank and its officers by victims and survivors of the 9/11 attacks.

In March 2002, as part of Operation Green Quest, a covert U.S. Treasury attempt to disrupt terrorist financing in the United States, U.S. law enforcement agents entered and searched 14 interwoven business and nonprofits in Virginia that were associated with the SAAR Foundation, a private charitable foundation established in 1983 that Sulaiman bin Abdulaziz Al Rajhi and two other Al Rajhi family members were on its initial board of directors. A law enforcement affidavit stated that over 100 nonprofit and businesses in Virginia were a part of the “Safa Group,” which were believed to be “engaged in the money laundering tactic of ‘layering’ to hide from law enforcement authorities the trail of its support for terrorists.” Subsequent 2006 federal grand jury subpoenas showed Al Rajhi Bank was not directly related to the entities subject to the March 2002 search. The decision of the U.S. Court of Appeals for the Fourth Circuit cited by the Staff Report in this regard indicated those matters involved counsel that has never represented either the bank or members of the Al Rajhi family.

The Al Rajhi name was identified on a file that displayed a handwritten list of 20 people listed as alleged key financial backers of al Qaeda. The list, an image of a scanned document on a CD-ROM, was found during a search of the Bosnian offices of the Benevolence International Foundation, a Saudi-based nonprofit later designated a terrorist organization by the Treasury Department. The Golden Chain was discussed in the 9/11 Commission's report, in Federal court filings, and civil lawsuits, though the Al Rajhi name was not specifically mentioned, while media reports as early as 2004 claim that the al Qaeda list included the Al Rajhi name.

In 2003, the U.S. Central Intelligence Agency (CIA) released a classified document entitled, “Al Rajhi Bank: Conduit for Extremist Finance.” According to Glenn Simpson of the Wall Street Journal, the CIA report ended with: “Senior Al Rajhi family members have long supported Islamic extremists and probably know that terrorists use their bank.” The 2003 CIA report stated that in 2000, Al Rajhi Bank couriers “delivered money to the Indonesian insurgent group Kompak to fund weapons purchases and bomb-making activities.” Al Rajhi Bank filed a defamation lawsuit in 2004 against the Wall Street Journal for a 2002 article that wrote about how Saudi Arabia was monitoring several accounts because of terrorist worries. The lawsuit settled in 2004 and the Wall Street Journal was not required to pay damages. The WSJ also published a letter from the bank's chief executive, and its own statement that the newspaper "did not intend to imply an allegation that [Al Rajhi Bank] supported terrorist activity, or had engaged in the financing of terrorism."

Three of the hijackers in the 9/11 terrorist attack, including Abdulaziz al Omari, reportedly used banking services through Al Rajhi Bank. Without violating applicable bank secrecy laws, the bank cannot confirm or deny this allegation. The National Commission on Terrorist Attacks Upon the United States found that the hijackers had accounts with and moved hundreds of thousands of dollars through many banks, including mainstream U.S. banks, but "[c]ontrary to persistent media reports, no financial institution filed a Suspicious Activity Report (SAR) in connection with any transaction of any of the 19 hijackers before 9/11 ...." This, however, “was not unreasonable” in the Commission's view because, “[e]ven in hindsight, there is nothing ... to indicate that any SAR should have been filed or the hijackers otherwise reported to law enforcement.”

In response to these allegations Al Rajhi Bank continues to condemn terrorism and deny any part in financing terrorists.

See also

 List of banks
 List of banks in Saudi Arabia

References

External link

Islamic banks of Saudi Arabia
Companies based in Riyadh